Petrus Johannes Wessels (born 29 November 1988) is a South African rugby union footballer. His regular playing position is openside flanker. He also played in the French Rugby Pro D2 for two seasons for La Rochelle.

External links

itsrugby.co.uk profile

Living people
1986 births
South African rugby union players
Rugby union flankers
Afrikaner people
South African people of Dutch descent
Cheetahs (rugby union) players
Free State Cheetahs players
People from Vereeniging
University of the Free State alumni
Rugby union players from Gauteng